Barachiel (Hebrew: בַּרַכְאֵל Baraḵʾēl, "God has blessed") is one of the Archangels in Judaism, as well as Byzantine Catholic and Eastern Orthodox tradition. He is the Archangel of Blessings.

In the Third Book of Enoch, he is described as one of the angelic princes, with a myriad of some  ministering angels attending him. He is described in the Almadel of Solomon as one of the chief angels of the first and fourth chora. In Jewish tradition, he is often associated with blessings, the planet Jupiter and the Sephirah of Chesed.

Iconography

In iconography Barachiel is sometimes shown holding a white rose against the chest, or with rose petals scattered on the clothing particularly the cloak. The scattering of rose petals was to symbolize or represent God's sweet blessings showering down on people. In Roman Catholicism, Barachiel is depicted holding a bread basket or a staff, both of which symbolize the blessings of children that God bestows on parents.

Patronage
Barachiel's responsibilities are as varied as the blessings for which the archangel is named. Barachiel is also the chief of the guardian angels and it is written that Barachiel may be prayed to for all the benefits which the guardian angel is thought to confer if one is not praying to the guardian angel directly, but as an intercession. He is seen as an official saint in Byzantine Catholic and Eastern Orthodox tradition, in particular a patron of family and married life. He is also seen as the angel assigned by God to watch over converts (also called "adopted children of God") to assist them in their lives.

Barachiel is also traditionally associated with the month of February and the Zodiacal sign Pisces. He is also sometimes described as being the ruler of the planet Jupiter and the zodiacal sign Scorpio.

Biblical texts

The Third Book of Enoch describes Archangel Barachiel as one of the Princes of the Host, who is appointed over the second heaven which is in the height of (Merom) Raqia. He and the other Holy Princes are also said to be accompanied by 496,000 myriads of Ministering Angels.

See also
 List of angels in theology

References
 
 
 

Archangels in Christianity
Angels in the Book of Enoch
Archangels
Kabbalah
Eastern Catholic saints
Eastern Orthodox saints